The Pretty on the Inside Tour was the first international concert tour by American alternative rock band Hole in promotion of their debut album, Pretty on the Inside. The tour began in the summer of 1991, and concluded in December of that year. The tour largely had Hole as a supporting act, with them performing as an opener for Mudhoney's European tour, as well as The Smashing Pumpkins in the United States.

Overview
In anticipation of the release of Hole's debut studio album, Pretty on the Inside (1991), the group embarked on an international concert tour in promotion of the record. The tour began in July 1991 in Los Angeles. For the first European leg of the tour, Hole was a supporting act for Mudhoney. The band returned to North America in the fall and toured in the United States and Canada before returning to Europe in November 1991. 

The band opened for Nirvana at several European dates, including in Ghent, Belgium and Nijmegen, Netherlands. During this time, frontwoman Courtney Love became romantically involved with Nirvana frontman Kurt Cobain; the two had previously been acquainted in May 1991.

The band returned to the United States in mid-December 1991, appearing as a supporting act for the West Coast tour of The Smashing Pumpkins, supporting their debut album, Gish.

Reception
Sam Batra of The Guardian wrote of the band's London date in December 1991: "There's no pretending that [Love] is in control. This is the sound of living on the edge and consequently working it out in splurges of furious noise seems to be the only articulation that has any authenticity," adding that "it's as if every flurry of noise unravels itself, breaks down as it struggles within the confines of a genre that is predominately male. Hole will burn themselves out. See them before they lose it willfully." Adam Sweeting, reviewing the University of London Union performance, noted that the band's songs seem to be "teetering on the edge of collapse, [while] Love pouts, whispers, and shrieks...  the volume of the voice is startling." Richard Cromelin of the Los Angeles Times observed of the band's supporting performance at a Los Angeles Smashing Pumpkins concert that the crowd "didn’t take to Courtney Love’s powerful howls of anguish." At the end of the show, Love "ordered the band to a halt and hurled her guitar to the ground," after which guitarist Eric Erlandson demolished his guitar by smashing it against the floor.

Other acts
Supporting
Hi Dummy
Drag
The Tunnel Frenzies (Manchester International II)
Daisy Chainsaw
Therapy?

Supported
Buffalo Tom
Dinosaur Jr.
Mudhoney 
Nirvana
The Smashing Pumpkins

Tour dates

Notes

References

Sources

1991 concert tours
Hole (band) concert tours